Galsi may refer to: 

 Galsi, Bardhaman, a village in Purba Bardhaman district, West Bengal, India.
 Galsi I, an administrative division in Bardhaman Sadar North subdivision of Purba Bardhaman district in the Indian state of West Bengal
 Galsi II, an administrative division in  Bardhaman Sadar North subdivision of Purba Bardhaman district in the Indian state of West Bengal
 Galsi Mahavidyalaya, a general degree college in Galsi, Purba Bardhaman district
 Galsi (Vidhan Sabha constituency), an electoral constituency in Purba Bardhaman district in the Indian state of West Bengal
 GALSI, a planned Algeria-Sardinia-Italy natural gas pipe line